Thomas C. Galligan Jr. (born September 3, 1955) is an American lawyer, legal scholar, administrator and educator who was the Interim President of Louisiana State University. He served as the eighth president of Colby-Sawyer College and as dean and professor of law at the University of Tennessee College of Law in Knoxville, where he taught torts and admiralty.

Galligan grew up in Montclair, New Jersey with the dream of becoming a lawyer. He graduated from Montclair Kimberley Academy in 1973.

Prior to taking up administrative roles, Galligan taught at the Paul M. Hebert Law Center from 1986 until May 1998. There, he was named the Dr. Dale E. Bennett Professor of Law and was honored by the students as the Outstanding LSU Professor six times. He returned to LSU as the commencement speaker in 2006, while he was then president-elect at Colby-Sawyer College.

Galligan has published numerous books and articles on torts and admiralty. His scholarship has been cited in the proposed Restatement (Third) of Torts and by numerous legal scholars. Galligan's work has also been cited by the United States Supreme Court and other federal and state appellate and trial courts.

His co-authored scholarship with Professor Frank L. Maraist has been honored by the Louisiana Bar Journal and the Tulane Law Review. Recently, Galligan was honored with the University of Tennessee National Alumni Association Public Service Award for 2006 and the Knoxville Bar Association's Law and Liberty Award.

His expertise in admiralty and international maritime law was widely sought after the Deepwater Horizon oil spill, including by the Associated Press, The Wall Street Journal, and The New York Times. Galligan also testified before the United States Senate's Committee on the Judiciary and the U.S. House of Representatives' Committee on the Judiciary, respectively.

Galligan has a passion for long-distance running and baseball statistics.  He has four children, one a graduate of Bates College and two graduates of Dartmouth College, and his daughter Jennifer who graduated Pitzer College.

Galligan has run over twenty marathons, one of which he completed with his daughter, Sarah. His daughter, Jennifer, currently sits as the Senior Development and Marketing Manager of Junior Achievement of Middle Tennessee.

References

American male writers
Louisiana State University faculty
Living people
Montclair Kimberley Academy alumni
People from Montclair, New Jersey
Presidents of Colby–Sawyer College
University of Tennessee faculty
Deans of law schools in the United States
1955 births